Where Have All the Flowers Gone? is a 2008 documentary film directed by Arturo Perez Jr. and produced by Arturo Perez Jr., Joel Sadler and Billy Troy. Perez, Sadler, and Troy travel to San Francisco to recapture the Summer of Love more than 40 years previously. The film premiered at the Wine Country Film Festival on August 4, 2008 and at San Francisco State University on September 26, 2008.

External links
 
 
 Hank Plante report on KCBS-TV
 Review in Juxtapoz Magazine 8/11/08

2008 films
American documentary films
Documentary films about United States history
Documentary films about American politics
Films shot in San Francisco
Hippie films
2008 documentary films
Documentary films about California
2000s English-language films
2000s American films
English-language documentary films